The Athletics at the 2016 Summer Paralympics – Men's 400 metres T36 event at the 2016 Paralympic Games took place on 16 September 2016, at the Estádio Olímpico João Havelange.

Final 
10:15 16 September 2016:

Notes

Athletics at the 2016 Summer Paralympics
2016 in men's athletics